Poh Soo Kai (born 1930) is a Singaporean medical doctor, politician, political prisoner. He was a founding member of the University Socialist Club and the People's Action Party (PAP).

Biography 
Poh was born in Singapore in 1930. He is the maternal grandson of prominent businessman Tan Kah Kee. His family fled Singapore before the Japanese invasion and landed in Mumbai, he studied at a Catholic mission school for four years. Poh and his family returned to Singapore after the Japanese surrender in 1945, continued his studies at Raffles Institution and entered the University of Malaya in 1950. He was a founding member of the Socialist Club in 1953 and became its second President from August that year till the following year. Poh was one of the eight members of the Fajar editorial board charged with sedition in 1954. He graduated three years later with a degree in medicine.

Poh became acquainted with Lee Kuan Yew, who was the honorary legal advisor to Fajar, during his time in university. He subsequently became a founding member of the PAP in 1954. When the party split in 1961, he left to join the Barisan Sosialis as its Assistant Secretary-General. He was arrested and detained without trial under the Preservation of Public Service Security Ordinance during Operation Coldstore in 1963. He was arrested again without trial under the Internal Security Act in 1976 and 1982. He co-edited the book, The Fajar Generation: The University Socialist Club and the Politics of Postwar Malaya and Singapore (2009).

Poh published his memoir titled Living in a Time of Deception in 2016. Based on his own recollection and records of the UK government, he provided a new perspective on key events in the political development of Singapore. His thesis is that Lee Kuan Yew's main purpose in seeking independence in conjunction with the merger with the Federation of Malaysia was to leverage the Malaysian government to immobilize his left-wing opponents. Lee feared that the left wing led by Lim Chin Siong would have defeated him in free elections.

References

1930 births
Singaporean people of Hokkien descent
People's Action Party politicians
Prisoners and detainees of Singapore
Singaporean prisoners and detainees
Living people
Raffles Institution alumni
20th-century Singaporean physicians